is a former Japanese football player.

Playing career
Urabe was born in Akashi on July 11, 1977. He joined J1 League club Cerezo Osaka from youth team in 1996. Although he could hardly play in the match in 1996, he played many matches as forward and offensive midfielder from 1997. In 1999, he moved to newly was promoted to J2 League club, Montedio Yamagata and played in 1 season. In 2000, he moved to Australian club Rochedale Rovers. He retired end of 2008 season.

Club statistics

References

External links 

1977 births
Living people
Association football people from Hyōgo Prefecture
Japanese footballers
Japanese expatriate footballers
J1 League players
J2 League players
Cerezo Osaka players
Montedio Yamagata players
Association football forwards